The Volga Germans) are ethnic Germans who settled and historically lived along the Volga River in the region of southeastern European Russia around Saratov and to the south. Recruited as immigrants to Russia in the 18th century, they were allowed to maintain their German culture, language, traditions and churches (Lutheran, Reformed, Catholics, Moravians and Mennonites). In the 19th and early 20th centuries, many Volga Germans emigrated to the United States, Canada, Brazil and Argentina.

During the Great Purge, Volga Germans were targeted, and following the German invasion of the Soviet Union in 1941, ethnic Germans were deported to concentration camps in Siberia and Central Asia resulting in the deaths of an estimated 1.5 million Volga Germans. Scholars refer to the deportations and subsequent mass casualties of the ethnic minorities under Stalin as ethnic cleansing and there is debate whether or not the expulsion was genocidal. Following the dissolution of the Soviet Union in 1991, some Volga Germans emigrated to Germany.

History

Invitation to Russia 

In 1762, Catherine II, born a German princess and a native of Stettin, Pomerania, deposed her husband Peter III, born a German prince in Kiel, and took the Russian imperial throne. Following the lead of Maria Theresa, Empress of Austria and Hungary, inviting Germans to settle on the Danube in the Balkans, Catherine the Great published manifestos in 1762 and 1763 inviting Non-Jewish Europeans to immigrate and become Russian subjects and farm Russian lands while maintaining their language and culture. Although the first received little response, the second improved the benefits offered and was more successful in attracting colonists. People in other countries such as France and England were more inclined to migrate to the colonies in the Americas. Other countries, such as Austria, forbade emigration.

Those who went to Russia had special rights under the terms of the manifesto. Some, such as being exempt from military service, were revoked in the latter part of the 19th century when the government needed more conscripts for the Russian army. The Plautdietsch-speaking Mennonite communities were opposed to military service because of their pacifist beliefs, so many Mennonites emigrated to the Americas instead.

19th century 
At the end of the 19th century, the Russian empire began to apply an aggressive policy of Russification. Although they had been promised a degree of relative autonomy (including being exempt from conscription) when they settled in the Russian empire, the Russian monarchy gradually eroded their specific rights as time went on. The Germans began to suffer a considerable loss of autonomy. Conscription was eventually reinstated. That was not wanted and was especially harmful to the Mennonites, who practice pacifism. Throughout the 19th century, pressure increased from the Russian government to culturally assimilate. Many Germans from Russia found it necessary to emigrate to avoid conscription and preserve their culture. This caused some Germans to organize themselves and send emissaries to some countries in the Americas in order to assess potential settlement destinations. The chosen destinations were Canada, United States, Brazil and Argentina. Most Volga Germans who settled in Latin America were Catholic. Many Catholic Volga Germans chose South America as their new homeland because the nations shared their religion.

North America 

Germans from Russia were the most traditional of German-speaking arrivals to North America. In the United States, many settled primarily in the Dakotas, Kansas, and Nebraska by 1900. The south-central part of North Dakota was known as "the German-Russian triangle" (that includes descendants of Black Sea Germans). A smaller number moved farther west, finding employment as ranchers and cowboys. They also settled in Iowa, Michigan, Minnesota, Oregon (especially in Portland), Washington, Wisconsin, and Fresno County in California's Central Valley. They often succeeded in dryland farming, which they had practiced in Russia. Many of the immigrants who arrived between 1870 and 1912 spent a period doing farm labor, especially in northeastern Colorado and in Montana along the lower Yellowstone River in sugar beet fields. Colonies kept in touch with each other through newspapers, especially Der Staats Anzeiger, based in North Dakota. By author Richard Sallet's count, there were 118,493 descendants of Volga Germans of the first and second generation living in the United States according to the 1920 United States census.

In Canada, the largest groups settled mainly in the area of the Great Plains: Alberta, Manitoba, and Saskatchewan.

South America 
Germans from Russia also settled in Argentina (see German Argentines) and Brazil (see German Brazilians). Additionally, many of the Volga Germans who had previously settled in Brazil later also went to settle in Argentina, due to the difficulties of planting wheat in Brazil, among other reasons.

In Argentina, Volga Germans have founded many colonies or villages. For example, around the city of Coronel Suárez in the South of Buenos Aires Province, around the city of Crespo in Entre Ríos Province, along the East of La Pampa Province, etc. Every year, the community of Volga German descendants holds different celebrations in the country in which they keep their traditions alive. For example, the Kerb (festival to honour the patron saint of a colony), the Kreppelfest, the Strudelfest, the Füllselfest, the Schlachtfest (also promoted by its Spanish name Fiesta de la Carneada), the Fiesta del Pirok (Bierock festival), etc.

Today 8% of the Argentine population or 3.5 million Argentines claim German ancestry. Of those, more than 2.5 million claim Volga German descent, making them the majority of those having German ancestry in the country, and accounting for 5.7% of the total Argentinian population. Descendants of Volga Germans outnumber descendants of Germans from Germany, which number 1 million in Argentina (2.3% of the population).

20th century 

Following the Russian Revolution, the Volga German Autonomous Soviet Socialist Republic was established in 1924, and it lasted until 1941. Its capital was Engels, known as Pokrovsk ( in German) before 1931.

Soviet deportation 
The deportation of the Volga Germans was the Soviet forced transfer of the whole of the Volga German population from the Volga German Autonomous Soviet Socialist Republic to Gulag concentration camps of forced labor located in Siberia,  Kazakhstan and even in arctic locations. The Soviets, bearing in mind the collaboration of the Sudeten Germans of Czechoslovakia with Nazi Germany, decided as a precautionary measure to transfer the Volga German population. 

These deportations, which also included the rest of the ethnic Germans from Russia, had been applied for several years before World War II and became particularly exhaustive on September 3, 1941, during the war.

Of all the ethnic German communities in the Soviet Union, the Volga Germans represented the single largest group expelled from their historical homeland. All their possessions were confiscated and they were deported only because of their ethnicity. Shortly after the German invasion, on June 22, 1941, Stalin sent Beria and Molotov to the Volga German Autonomous Soviet Socialist Republic to determine a course of action for its German inhabitants, as a way of carrying out collective revenge on the civilian population. On return, they recommended the deportation of the entire German population. Consequently, the Central Committee of the Communist Party issued a resolution on August 12, calling for the expulsion of the entire ethnic German population. With this authority, Beria on August 27 issued an order entitled "On Measures for Conducting the Operation of Resettling the Germans from the Volga German Republic, Saratov, and Stalingrad Oblasts", assigning the deputy head of the NKVD, (secret police) Ivan Serov, to command this operation. He also allocated NKVD and Red Army troops to carry out the transfer. The Germans were to be sent to various oblasts (provinces) in Siberia, Kazakhstan and others, beginning on September 3, and ending on September 20, 1941. On September 7, 1941, the Volga German Autonomous Soviet Socialist Republic was officially abolished, clearly showing that the Soviets considered the expulsion of the Germans final.

On August 28, 1941, the Presidium of the Supreme Soviet of the USSR approved and published a decree, which was the only official decree ever published by the Soviet Union concerning the deportation and exile of the German Russian community. The Soviet regime stated that the evacuation was a preventive measure so that the German population would not be misled into collaborating with the German Army rather than a punitive measure, and they did not reveal the sentence to the forced labor camps. Stalin allegedly gave the following "secret" order to the NKVD, produced in German controlled Latvia on September 20, 1941:

"After the house search, tell everyone who is scheduled to be deported that, according to the government's decision, they are being sent to other regions of the USSR. Transport the entire family in one car until the train station, but at the station, heads of families must be loaded into a separate train car prepared especially for them. Their families are deported for special settlements in the far away regions of the Union. [Family members] must not know about the forthcoming separation from the head of the family."
This above document may be a fabrication, as Latvia was under German occupation at that time. Nevertheless, the instructions were followed by the NKVD troops who directed the deportation.

The reason for separating the men is that they were all destined for forced labor camps, Trudarmee (NKVD labor army). The deported and enslaved Germans coined this phrase, whereas Soviet documents only referred to "labor obligations" or "labor regulations." Men between the ages of 15 and 55 and, later, women between the ages of 16 and 45 were forced to do labor in the forests and mines of Siberia and Central Asia under conditions similar to that prevalent in the Gulag forced labor camps, while other Germans were directly deported to Gulag forced labor camps.

The expulsion of the Volga Germans finished on schedule at the end of September 1941. According to the Soviet Union, the total number sent to forced internal exile was about 950,000. However, the actual estimated number of victims is much higher. It took 151 train convoys to accomplish the first transfers of the Volga German population, an astounding figure when one considers that the Soviet Union was heavily engaged fighting the advancing German army, and all railway stock was required to bring soldiers to the front. This operation also involved 1,550 NKVD and 3,250 police agents assisted by 12,150 soldiers of the Red Army.

In 1941, after the Nazi invasion, the NKVD (via Prikaz No. 35105) banned ethnic Germans from serving in the Soviet military. They sent tens of thousands of these soldiers to the Trudarmee.

In 1942, nearly all the able-bodied German population was conscripted to the NKVD labor columns or had been sent to the Gulag forced labor camps. According to Stanford historian Robert Conquest, during the first stage, about one-third (estimated at 1.5 million) did not survive the camps. The conditions imposed on ethnic Germans by the regime continued to be inhumane. The deportation and subsequent deaths to ethnic minorities during Stalin's rule is referred to as an ethnic cleansing. Some historians refer to these acts as a genocide, though there is debate whether or not the destruction of non-Russians was intentional. Ethnically German minorities received little empathy for mass expulsions due to their German ancestral relation to nazis. There is debate among sociologists and historians whether ethnic cleansing is genocide.

Recent years 
The Volga Germans never returned to the Volga region in their old numbers. They were not allowed to settle in the area for decades. After World War II, many survivors remained in the Ural Mountains, Siberia, Kazakhstan (1.4% of today's Kazakh population are recognized as Germans - around 200,000), Kyrgyzstan, and Uzbekistan (about 16,000 or 0.064%). Decades after the war, some talked about resettling where the German Autonomous Republic used to be. But all their properties had been occupied by Russian communists. They met opposition from the new population there and did not persevere. 

A proposal in June 1979 called for a new German Autonomous Republic within Kazakhstan, with a capital in Ermentau. The proposal was aimed at addressing the living conditions of the displaced Volga Germans. At the time, around 936,000 ethnic Germans were living in Kazakhstan, as the republic's third-largest ethnic group. On June 16, 1979, demonstrators in Tselinograd (Astana) protested this proposal. Fearing a negative reaction among the majority Kazakhs and calls for autonomy among local Uyghurs, the ruling Communist Party scrapped the proposal for ethnic German autonomy within Kazakhstan.

Since the late 1980s and the fall of the Soviet Union, some ethnic Germans have returned in small numbers to Engels, but many more emigrated permanently to Germany. They took advantage of the German law of return, a policy that grants citizenship to all those who can prove to be a refugee or expellee of German ethnic origin or as the spouse or descendant of such a person.

Since the collapse of the Soviet Union in 1991 and the independence of the Baltic states, some Russian ethnic Germans began to return to the area of the Kaliningrad Oblast (formerly part of East Prussia), especially Volga Germans from other parts of Russia and Kazakhstan, as well as to the Volga Germans' old territory in southern Russia near Volgograd. This tempo increased after Germany stopped granting the free right of return to ethnic Germans from the former Soviet Union. As of the 2002 Russian census, 8,340 Germans (or 0.87% of the population) were listed in the Kaliningrad Oblast, dropping to 7,349 in 2010 due to deaths. Volgograd Oblast counted 10,102 Germans in the 2010 Census. However, almost none of the pre-World War II German population remains in the Kaliningrad Oblast, with the vast majority of the current population being recent Russian-speaking migrants. Due to the new restrictions by the German government, the flow of ethnic Germans to Germany has greatly slowed if not ceased, while the remaining Germans in Central Asia continue to emigrate, but to Russia instead of Germany.

Notable Volga Germans 

Philip Anschutz (born 1939), American billionaire businessman.
Harold W. Bauer (1908–1942), American USMC fighter pilot.
Tom Daschle (born 1947), American politician.
Sergio Denis (1949–2020), Argentine singer-songwriter
Jean Bethke Elshtain (1941–2013), American political philosopher and academic.
Joe Exotic (born 1963), American former Zoo owner.
Helene Fischer (born 1984), German singer, dancer and entertainer.
Tim Gaines (born 1962), American musician.
Sir Andre Geim (born 1958), Russian-born Dutch-British physicist and 2010 Nobel laureate.
Jim Geringer (born 1944), American politician, 30th Governor of Wyoming.
Sonja Graf (1908–1965), German chess player who became woman's champion of the US.
Gabriel Heinze (born 1978), Argentine football player.
Óscar Ibáñez (born 1967), Argentine-born Peruvian football player.
Viktor Kress (born 1948), Russian politician, governor of Tomsk Oblast, Russia.
Randy Meisner (born 1946), American musician, original bassist with the Eagles.
Roman Neustädter (born 1988), Russian-German football player.
Peter Neustädter (born 1966), Kyrgyz-born German football player and coach.
Boris Rauschenbach, (1915–2001), scientist, physicist in Russia.
Eduard Rossel (born 1937), Russian politician.
Cher Scarlett (born 1984 or 1985), American software engineer and labor activist.
Alfred Schnittke (1934–1998), Russian composer.
Kendall Schmidt (born 1990), American singer of Big Time Rush.
Robert Shwartzman (born 1999), Russian racing driver.
Alvina Shpady (1935–2019), Uzbek artist and art restorer.
Afu Thomas (born 1988), German Internet celebrity active in China.
Mitch Unrein (born 1987), American football player.
Sergio Unrein (born 1991), Argentine football player.
Lawrence Welk (1903–1992), American entertainer.

Language 
The greatest number of Volga Germans emigrated from Hesse and the Palatinate, and spoke Hessian and Palatine Rhine Franconian dialects to which the colonists from other regions, and even from other countries like Sweden, assimilated. Some Volga German dialects are very similar to Pennsylvania Dutch language, another Palatine Rhine Franconian language; in either dialect, one could say:
 (spelled according to standard German pronunciation rules:) Mehr volla mohl gaern in die sche gehl Kaerrich geha.
 (in German:) Wir wollen einmal gern in die schöne gelbe Kirche gehen.
 (in English:) We would like to go into the beautiful yellow church.

Some other common words:

The above list only attempts to reproduce the pronunciation and does not represent how the Volga Germans wrote. The dialects of the Germans of Russia mainly presented differences in pronunciation, as occurs in the diversity of the English language. However, Volga Germans wrote and kept their records in Standard German.

Volga Germans only borrowed a few but anecdotal Russian words, like Erbus ("watermelon" from Russian арбуз "watermelon"), which they carried with them on their subsequent moves to North America and Argentina.

See also 
 Kazakhstan Germans
 History of Germans in Russia and the Soviet Union
 Volga German Autonomous Soviet Socialist Republic
 Volhynia
 Russian Mennonites
 Baltic Germans

References

Bibliography

Further reading 
 Koch, Fred C. The Volga Germans: in Russia and the Americas, from 1763 to the present (Penn State Press, 2010).
 Mukhina, Irina. The Germans of the Soviet Union (Routledge, 2007).
 Salitan, Laurie P. "Soviet Germans: A Brief History and an Introduction to Their Emigration." in Politics and Nationality in Contemporary Soviet-Jewish Emigration, 1968–89 ( Palgrave Macmillan UK, 1992) pp 72–83.
 Waters, Tony. "Towards a theory of ethnic identity and migration: the formation of ethnic enclaves by migrant Germans in Russia and North America." International Migration Review (1995): 515-544.

External links 
 The Volga German Institute at Fairfield University
 The Center for Volga German Studies at Concordia University 
 Germans from Russia Heritage Society
 Flag
 Volga Germans
 American Historical Society of Germans from Russia
 Germans from Russia Heritage Collection North Dakota State University
 Germans from Russia in Argentina Genealogy 
 Wolgadeutschen 
 The Golden Jubilee of German-Russian Settlements of Ellis and Rush Counties, Kansas
 Germans from Russia in Argentina
 German Memories - Volga Germans Migration Towards Americas
 Elaine Frank Davison Germans from Russia collection at the Whitman College and Northwest Archives, Whitman College.

 
Russian and Soviet-German people
German diaspora in Europe
Germany–Soviet Union relations
Germany–Russia relations
Ethnic cleansing of Germans
Ethnic groups in Russia
Ethnic groups in Kazakhstan
German minorities